So Fresh: The Hits of Winter 2005 is a compilation of songs that were popular in Australia in winter 2005. It was released on 11 June 2005.

Track listing 
 Will Smith – "Switch" (3:17)
 Gwen Stefani featuring Eve – "Rich Girl" (3:57)
 Mario – "Let Me Love You" (4:17)
 Mariah Carey featuring Jermaine Dupri and Fatman Scoop – "It's Like That" (3:23)
 Frankie J – "Obsession (No Es Amor) (So Fresh Version)" (3:20)
 Nitty – "Hey Bitty" (2:50)
 Tammin – "Whatever Will Be" (3:46)
 Britney Spears – "Do Somethin'" (3:23)
 Anthony Callea – "Rain" (3:47)
 Delta Goodrem and Brian McFadden – "Almost Here" (3:47)
 Shakaya featuring Nate Wade – "Are You Ready" (3:23)
 Ashlee Simpson – "La La" (3:42)
Usher – "Caught Up" (3:46)
 Destiny's Child – "Soldier" (So Fresh Version) (3:53)
 Joel Turner and The Modern Day Poets – "Funk U Up" (4:15)
 Guy Sebastian – "Oh Oh" (Cutfather & Joe Remix) (3:17)
 Avril Lavigne – "He Wasn't" (2:59)
 Lindsay Lohan – "Over" (3:39)
 Rogue Traders – "Voodoo Child" (3:33)
 BodyRockers – "I Like the Way" (3:21)

Charts

See also
So Fresh

References

External links
 Official site

So Fresh albums
2005 compilation albums
2005 in Australian music